Omicron Andromedae (ο And, ο Andromedae) is a star system in the constellation Andromeda.  It is approximately 692 light years from Earth.  The system as a whole is classified as a blue-white B-type giant, with a mean combined apparent magnitude of +3.62.

System
Omicron Andromedae is a multiple star containing at least three components. It may consist of two close pairs in a wider orbit, making a four-star system, although the binarity of the primary star is in doubt.

The components A and B were first resolved in 1949, when they were reported to be separated by less than 0.1".  In 1975 they were separated by 0.375" and by 2014 by only 0.21".  An orbit has been derived with a period of 118 years.  The companion is 2.3 magnitudes fainter than the primary star.

In 1975, a companion was discovered by speckle interferometry only 0.05" from component A.  Components Aa and Ab orbit every 5.6 years, although the existence of this companion is now doubted.

A spectroscopic binary in the system was suspected and in 1988 it was confirmed.  Although a clear 33.01 day period was seen, it was unclear which component was the pair seen in the spectrum.  Eventually, it was settled that component B was a close spectroscopic binary.

Properties

Omicron Andromedae is a Gamma Cassiopeiae type variable star and the system's brightness varies from magnitude +3.58 to +3.78.  The variable component is the brightest and most massive star in the system, Aa.  Omicron Andromedae also shows variations with a period of about a day, similar to a β Lyrae-type eclipsing variable, but these are thought to be intrinsic to one of the components and not due to eclipses.

The spectrum is predominantly that of a B6 giant star, from the brightest component in the system.  It is a shell star and the spectrum contains emission lines with variable profiles.

Spectral lines similar to an A2 star are also detectable in the spectrum and these are thought to originate in the B component.

References

External links
 Image ο Andromedae

Andromeda (constellation)
Andromedae, Omicron
B-type giants
Andromedae, 01
4
Spectroscopic binaries
Gamma Cassiopeiae variable stars
113726
8762
Durchmusterung objects
217675 6